The 1986 Maui Invitational Tournament was an early-season college basketball tournament that was played, for the 3rd time (and first in the 8-team bracket format), from November 28 to November 30, 1986. The tournament, which began two years prior in 1984, was part of the 1986-87 NCAA Division I men's basketball season. It was the first title for the program and its head coach C. M. Newton.

Bracket

References

Maui Invitational Tournament
Maui Invitational